The American West Symphony of Sandy is based in Sandy, Utah. The symphony orchestra was found in 1988 under the name The Orchestra of Sandy. The orchestra's mission is one of cultural outreach to educate and entertain families. The orchestra's musical director is Joel Rosenberg.

The orchestra provides the community with 14 concerts per season. Repertoire includes works by Verdi, Rossini, Copland, Handel, Tchaikovsky, Haydn, Sibelius, Brahms, Bernstein, Rimsky-Korsakov and Berlioz. The yearly Christmas Concert also includes some popular selections as well.

The orchestra plays in venues within the Salt Lake Valley such as the Salt Lake Assembly Hall, the Salt Lake Tabernacle, Libby Gardner Music Hall, and the Sandy Amphitheater.

External links
 The American West Symphony and Chorus of Sandy

References

Musical groups established in 1988
American orchestras
Musical groups from Utah
Performing arts in Utah
1988 establishments in Utah